Canada Unity is a group that campaigned against COVID-19 mask mandates and vaccine passports during the Canada convoy protest.

Organization 
The group was founded by Sandra and James Bauder of Calgary.

The group's Facebook page was registered in late 2019. By March 2021, the group's website had 30 members.

Activities 
The group had a low profile until the January lead up to the Canada convoy protest, when the group organised protestor's movement to Ottawa and published routes to the protest location on its website. During the Canada convoy protest, the group tried to advance a memorandum of understanding (MOU) with Governor General of Canada Mary Simon to overthrow the federal government of Canada and revoke COVID-19 public health measures, despite that being legally impossible for a governor general to do. At the 2022 Emergencies Act Inquiry, protest leader Chris Barber said he did not like the undemocratic nature of the MOU. The MOU attracted 320,000 signatures before being withdrawn by the Canada Unity.

By 2022, all other convoy protest leaders had disassociated themselves from Canada Unity.

See also 
 COVID-19 pandemic in Canada

References

External links 
 Official website

Canada convoy protest
COVID-19 pandemic in Canada
2020s in Ottawa